Ballou is an unincorporated community in Shelby County, in the U.S. state of Ohio.

History
Ballou was one of at least three communities within Green Township. A post office called Ballou was established in 1884, and remained in operation until 1902.

References

Unincorporated communities in Shelby County, Ohio
Unincorporated communities in Ohio